Hermann Heibel (21 July 1912 – 19 August 1941) was a German swimmer. He competed in two events at the 1936 Summer Olympics. He was killed in action during World War II while fighting in Operation Barbarossa.

References

External links
 

1912 births
1941 deaths
German male swimmers
Olympic swimmers of Germany
Swimmers at the 1936 Summer Olympics
German military personnel killed in World War II
People from Neuwied
Sportspeople from Rhineland-Palatinate
20th-century German people